Beatrice Mancini (7 December 1917 – 1 March 1987) was an Italian actress. She starred in the 1941 film Blood Wedding.

Born Bice Mancinotti in Rome, Mancini studied at the Accademia Nazionale d'Arte Drammatica and made her film debut in 1935 in La capanna dell'amore, credited as Milva Vejo. She was often cast in roles of hapless, sensible and good-heart girls.

Selected filmography
 The Anonymous Roylott (1936)
 Luciano Serra, Pilot (1938)
 Wealth Without a Future (1939)
 Big Shoes (1940)
 Caravaggio (1941)
 Blood Wedding (1941)
 Rita of Cascia (1943)
 The White Angel (1943)

References

Bibliography 
 Goble, Alan. The Complete Index to Literary Sources in Film. Walter de Gruyter, 1999.

External links 
 

1917 births
1987 deaths
Italian film actresses
Actresses from Rome
20th-century Italian actresses
Italian stage actresses
Accademia Nazionale di Arte Drammatica Silvio D'Amico alumni